Lübeck Flughafen (Airport) station is an airport station on the Lübeck–Lüneburg railway in Lübeck in the German state of Schleswig-Holstein. It has been in service for passengers since May 2008. Lübeck-Blankensee station had been located in the same place, but it was closed a long time ago.

The Lübeck–Lüneburg railway runs close to the currently unused Lübeck Airport. The opening of the station has improved the accessibility of the airport; the trip from Lübeck Hauptbahnhof has decreased from some 30 minutes by bus to less than ten minutes.

The installation of a lift to the bridge running above the platform has significantly shortened the route to the airport. The completion of the lift took over two years.

Rail services 

The station is located on the Kiel–Lüneburg route. It is served hourly daily (weekdays and Sundays) in each direction (April 2013). So there are two departures every hour from this station. Scheduled services are operated with a class 648 (Alstom Coradia LINT) diesel multiple units. Coming from Kiel there is a direct connection without change from Kiel Hauptbahnhof  to this station; from Hamburg, there are two connections per hour to this station, one with a change in Lübeck and the other with a change in Büchen.

The following service stops at the station:

Planning 
It has been suggested that Lübeck Flughafen station (or Ratzeburg) could be the starting point for a service of a Lübeck S-Bahn that would run every half hour from here to Hochschulstadtteil, the Hauptbahnhof, Dänischburg, Kücknitz and Travemünde.

Notable places nearby
Lübeck Airport

Notes

Railway stations in Schleswig-Holstein
Flughafen station
Flughafen station
Airport railway stations in Germany
Railway stations in Germany opened in 2008